is a five-member Japanese rock band formed in 2013 and mainly active in Osaka. the band currently consists of vocalist Yudai Takenaka, guitarists Kaito Yamada and Sôjirô Oki, drummer Negi and bassist Keigo.

History

2013–2016: Formation and early career 
In July 2013 it the group was formed with its original members, including Yudai, as a copy band of One Ok Rock.

In July 2016, Kimunii and Takuya withdrew.

2017–2019: Skywalk and EN. 
In January 2017, Kaito, Sôjirô and Negi. joined the group.

It was independent record label Emperor Mode.

The band's first single under Morning Light, was released on 5 January 2017. The band's second single Count on me, was released on 13 August 2017. The band's third single Like a hawk Flying in the Night Sky, was released on 25 December 2017.

The band's single Walking with you, was released on 30 August 2018. The band's second single To Hikari, was released on 27 September 2018.

In October 2018, The band's first mini album Skywalk, was released on 3 October 2018.

In December 2018, bassist Yutaro withdrew.

In January 2019, bassist Keigo joined replace Yutaro.

The band's single Dear Sir, Dear You was, released on 7 August 2019. The second single Two Shadows, was released on 1 September 2019.

In September 2019, The band's second mini album EN., was released on 3 September 2019.

2019–2021: First album Wonderland and Opening Declaration 

In October 2019, it was announced that the band had signed to Emperor Driver.

The band's single Runner's High, was released on 5 January 2020. The band's single second Kimiiro Note, was released on 21 April 2020. The band's single third Dream Fireworks, was released on 27 May 2020. The band's single fourth Photo Album, was released on 26 July 2020.

The band's first debut album Wonderland, was released on 27 May 2020.

In August 2020, it was announced that the band had signed to major Universal Sigma was announced.

The band's single Sunny Drop, was released on 17 August 2020. The band's single second I just asked for you, was released on 30 November 2020. The band's single third Evening Primrose, was released on 11 December 2020.

The band's single fourth Fairy Tale, was released on 19 February 2021. The band's single fifth Hummingbird, was released on 10 April 2021. The band's single sixth Love Knot, was released on 26 April 2021. The band's single seventh Pandora, was released on 28 April 2021. The band's single eighth Opening Declaration was released on 15 May 2021.

The band's second album Opening Declaration, was released on 24 April 2021.

The band's single The Last Hope, was released on 8 July 2021.

2021–present: Assort 
The band's single Life Squall, was released on 23 July 2021. The band's single second Sword of Kindness, was released on 4 September 2021. The band's single third Seeker, was released on 25 October 2021. The band's single fourth 1ROOM, was released on 15 November 2021.

On 10 November 2021, it was announced for Tour Novelbright, will be held from June 23 to 24, 2022.

The band's single fifth Okey Dokey!!, was released on 2 December 2021, in collaboration with Pokémon Unite. The group was briefly renamed "NovelUNITE" specifically for this collaboration.

The single sixth The Warrior, was released on 23 February 2022. The band's single seventh Aitoka Koitoka, was released on 22 April 2022. The band's single eighth Fanfare, was released on 5 May 2022.

The band's third studio album Assort, on 18 May 2022.

The band's single Why, was released on 10 August 2022.

In August 2022, it was announced first Summer Sonic Chiba from 20 August 2022.

Overview 

 Novelbright become popular on SNS after launching a video on TikTok in September 2019 of them performing "Walking with you" at an acoustic live on the street in front of Sendai Station which rapidly spread on Twitter and gained over 200,000 likes and 48,000 retweets, the song then ranked on streaming sites, it achieved the no.1 position for 8 consecutive weeks on the Spotify Japan viral chart and the no. 2 position on Japan Line Music BGM. Some other songs like "Haikei, shin'ainaru-kun e" from the 2nd mini album "EN.", was also in the top ten in Spotify. The chart had four songs in the top 50 by October.
 The group had a major a debut in 2020. They became one of four recipients of the New Artist Award at the 62nd Japan Record Awards.

Musical style and songwriting

Band members
Current members
 – vocals (2013–present) 
 – guitar, backing vocals (2017–present)
 – guitar, backing vocals (2017–present)
 – drums, percussion (2017–present)
 – bass guitar (2019–present)

Former members
 – guitar (2013–2016)
 – drums, percussion (2013–2016)
 – bass guitar (2013–2018)

Discography

Studio albums

Mini albums

Singles

Music videos

Tours and concerts

Awards

References

External links 
 

Japanese hard rock musical groups
Musical groups from Osaka
Musical groups established in 2013